The TD Canadian Children's Literature Award is an annual Canadian literary award, presented to the year's best work of children's literature. Sponsored by TD Bank Financial Group and the Canadian Children's Book Centre, the award carries a monetary prize of $30,000. On September 11th, 2018 it was announced that the monetary prize was increased from $30,000 to $50,000.

Two awards are presented annually, one each for English language and French language works. The award is one of several presented by the Canadian Children's Book Centre each year; others include the Norma Fleck Award for Canadian Children’s Non-Fiction, the Geoffrey Bilson Award for Historical Fiction for Young People and the Marilyn Baillie Picture Book Award.

Winners

English
2005 - Marthe Jocelyn, Mable Riley: A Reliable Record of Humdrum
2006 - Pamela Porter, The Crazy Man
2007 - Sarah Ellis, Odd Man Out
2008 - Christopher Paul Curtis, Elijah of Buxton
2009 - Nicola I. Campbell and Kim LaFave, Shin-chi's Canoe
2010 - Arthur Slade, The Hunchback Assignments
2011 - Erin Bow, Plain Kate
2012 - Trilby Kent, Stones for My Father
2013 - Polly Horvath, One Year in Coal Harbour
2014 - Kathy Stinson, The Man with the Violin
2015 - Jonathan Auxier, The Night Gardener
2016 - Melanie Florence & François Thisdale, Missing Nimâmâ
2017 - Jan Thornhill, The Tragic Tale of the Great Auk
2018 - Joanne Schwartz (writer) and Sydney Smith (illustrator), Town is by the Sea
2019 - Heather Smith, Ebb and Flow
2020 - Julie Flett, Birdsong, published by Greystone Books
2021 - The Fan Brothers and Devin Fan, The Barnabus Project
2022 - David A. Robertson and Julie Flett, On the Trapline

French
2005 - François Barcelo and Anne Villeneuve, Le nul et la chipie
2006 - François Gravel and Pierre Pratt, David et le salon funéraire
2007 - André Leblanc, L'envers de la chanson : des enfants au travail 1850-1950
2008 - Gilles Vigneault and Stéphane Jorisch, Un cadeau pour Sophie
2009 - Anne Villeneuve, Chère Traudi
2010 - Mélanie Tellier and Melinda Josie, Le géranium
2011 - Linda Amyot, La fille d'en face
2012 - Mario Brassard and Suana Verelst, La saison des pluies
2013 - Michel Noël, À la recherche du bout du monde
2014 - Andrée Poulin, La plus grosse poutine du monde
2015 - Marianne Dubuc, L'autobus
2016 - Jacques Goldstyn, L'arbragan
2017 - Larry Tremblay and Guillaume Perreault, Même pas vrai
2018 - Marianne Dubuc, Le chemin de la montagne
2019 - Stéphanie Boulay, Anatole qui ne séchait jamais
2020 - Jacques Goldstyen, L’étoiles
2021 - Vigg, Ma maison-tête
2022 - Orbie, La fin des poux ?

References

External links

TD Canadian Children's Literature Award

Canadian children's literary awards
Awards established in 2005
2005 establishments in Canada